The 2003 Nigerian House of Representatives elections in Bayelsa State was held on April 12, 2003, to elect members of the House of Representatives to represent Bayelsa State, Nigeria.

Overview

Summary

Results

Brass/Nembe 
PDP candidate Kalango Youpele won the election, defeating other party candidates.

Ogbia 
PDP candidate Clever Ikisikpo won the election, defeating other party candidates.

Sagbama/Ekeremor  
Party candidate won the election, defeating other party candidates.

Southern Ijaw 
APGA candidate Ere E. Fereinsikumo won the election, defeating other party candidates.

Yenagoa/Kolokuna/Opokuma 
Party candidate won the election, defeating other party candidates.

References 

Bayelsa State House of Representatives elections
House of Representatives 
Bayelsa State House of Representatives elections